The Indian Register is the official record of people registered under the Indian Act in Canada, called  status Indians or registered Indians. People registered under the Indian Act have rights and benefits that are not granted to other First Nations people, Inuit, or Métis, the chief benefits of which include the granting of reserves and of rights associated with them, an extended hunting season, easier access to firearms, an exemption from federal and provincial taxes on reserve, and more freedom in the management of gaming and tobacco franchises via less government interference and taxes.

History
In 1851 the colonial governments of British North America began to keep records of Indians and bands entitled to benefits under treaty. For 100 years, individual Indian agents made lists of members who belonged to each band. In 1951, the current Indian Register was established by amendment of the Indian Act, and the many band lists were combined into one.

In 1985, the Indian Act was amended again with the goal of restoring First Nations status to people who had lost it through discriminatory provisions of the act, and to their children. Over 100,000 people who had lost their status in this way were added to the register.

Registration under the Indian Act ("Indian status")
The list is maintained by Indigenous Services Canada. Sole authority for determining who will be registered is held by the Indian Registrar.

Revocation of status
The discriminatory reasons for revoking status were:

 marrying a man who was not registered under the Indian Act
 enfranchisement (until 1960, an Indian could vote in federal elections only by renouncing their status as a person who was registered under the Indian Act, i.e. their "Indian status")
 having a mother and paternal grandmother who were not registered under the Indian Act (these people lost status at 21)
 being born out of wedlock of a mother who was registered under the Indian Act and a father who was not.

Documentary proof of Indian status
Since 1956 the Canadian federal government has issued an identity document to individuals who are registered under the Indian Act.  Traditionally these documents have been used by First Nations people in Canada to cross the border between Canada and the United States under the Jay Treaty. The document is called a certificate of Indian status or secure certificate of Indian status. It is often called a "status card".

Non-status Indians

See also

Royal Commission on Aboriginal Peoples
Congress of Aboriginal Peoples
The Canadian Crown and First Nations, Inuit and Métis

Aboriginal land title in Canada

Compare with
 Blood quantum laws - the method of determining eligibility for treaty benefits in the United States

References

External links
 Indigenous Services Canada

First Nations
Canadian Aboriginal and indigenous law
Government documents
1850 establishments in Canada